First Affair is an album by The Four Freshmen. It was released in 1960 by Capitol Records.

Track listing
 “Please Be Kind” (Saul Chaplin, Sammy Cahn)
 “I Hadn't Anyone Till You” (Ray Noble)
 “At Last” (Harry Warren, Mack Gordon)
 “I Didn't Know About You” (Duke Ellington, Bob Russell)
 “Polka Dots and Moonbeams” (Jimmy Van Heusen, Johnny Burke)
 “I'm Beginning to See the Light” (Duke Ellington, Johnny Hodges, Harry James, Don George)
 “Long Ago (and Far Away)” (Jerome Kern, Ira Gershwin)
 “I've Never Been in Love Before” (Frank Loesser)
 “Be Careful, It's My Heart” (Irving Berlin)
 “It's a New World” (Harold Arlen, Ira Gershwin)
 “I Can't Believe That You're in Love With Me” (Jimmy McHugh, Clarence Gaskell)
 “First Affair” (Ken Albers, Ross Barbour)

Personnel 
 Don Barbour – vocals
 Ross Barbour – vocals
 Bob Flanigan – vocals, trombone
 Ken Albers – vocals, trumpet
 Dick Reynolds – vocal arranger
 Bill Mathieu – vocal arranger (track 5)
 Al Viola – guitar

References 

The Four Freshmen albums
Capitol Records albums
1960 albums